Actinopus concinnus is a species of mygalomorph spider in the family Actinopodidae. It can be found in Venezuela.

The specific name concinnus is Latin for bizarre.

References 

Actinopus
Spiders of South America
Spiders described in 2020
Invertebrates of Venezuela